is a Japanese actor. He was represented with the agency Ais. On December 31, 2020, he retired from the entertainment industry.

Filmography

Stage

TV dramas

Films

Advertisements

Music videos

Internet

References

External links
 
 

21st-century Japanese male actors
Actors from Saitama Prefecture
1990 births
Living people